Medlicott is a surname. It may refer to:

 Brig. Frank Medlicott (1903–1972), U.K. politician
 Henry Benedict Medlicott (1829–1905), Irish geologist; younger brother of Joseph
 Joseph G. Medlicott (died 1866), Irish geologist; older brother of Henry
 Judith Medlicott, New Zealand lawyer and former Chancellor of the University of Otago
 W. N. Medlicott (William Norton Medlicott, 1900–1987), British historian
 Medlicott (Cambridgeshire cricketer) (first name and dates unknown; c.1795–?), English first-class cricketer

Other uses
 Medlicott, Shropshire; see List of United Kingdom locations: Me-Mic
 Medlicott Dome, a prominent granite dome in Yosemite high country, named after Henry P. Medlicott, surveyor of the Tioga Road

See also
Sawyer–Medlicott House, a historic house at the junction of Bradford and River roads in Piermont, New Hampshire